Arantxa Sánchez Vicario successfully defended her title, by defeating Steffi Graf 4–6, 7–6(7–3), 7–6(8–6) in the final.

Seeds

Draw

Finals

Top half

Bottom half

References

External links
 Official results archive (ITF)
 Official results archive (WTA)

Citizen Cup - Singles
WTA Hamburg
1994 in German women's sport
1994 in German tennis